Highspire is a borough in Dauphin County, Pennsylvania, United States. The population was 2,736 at the 2020 census, an increase over the figure of 2,399 tabulated in 2010. It is part of the Harrisburg–Carlisle Metropolitan Statistical Area.

History
It is debated as to whether the town was named for the high spire of the church that could be seen from the Susquehanna River, or for the town in Bavaria where the original settlers and founders of the town were from. Either way, the town has a rich history of logging, the Pennsylvania canal system, candy, potato chips, whiskey, and hard working folks. It is a quaint little town nestled in between the towns of Steelton (home of the steel mill) and Middletown (where Harrisburg International Airport is located).

The Highspire High School was added to the National Register of Historic Places in 1990.

Geography
Highspire is located in southern Dauphin County at  (40.207622, -76.784698), on the northeast bank of the Susquehanna River. Interstate 76, the Pennsylvania Turnpike, curves around the west and north sides of the borough, with indirect access from Exit 247 (Interstate 283).

Notable person

The American actor Don Keefer (1916–2014) was born in Highspire.

Demographics

As of the census of 2000, there were 2,720 people, 1,279 households, and 689 families residing in the borough. The racial makeup of the borough was 86.62% White, 8.20% African American, 0.11% Native American, 0.88% Asian, 2.17% from other races, and 2.02% from two or more races. Hispanic or Latino of any race were 5.11% of the population.

There were 1,279 households, out of which 22.7% had children under the age of 18 living with them, 37.3% were married couples living together, 12.0% had a female householder with no husband present, and 46.1% were non-families. 38.2% of all households were made up of individuals, and 13.5% had someone living alone who was 65 years of age or older. The average household size was 2.13 and the average family size was 2.83.

In the borough the population was spread out, with 19.8% under the age of 18, 9.6% from 18 to 24, 32.8% from 25 to 44, 22.6% from 45 to 64, and 15.2% who were 65 years of age or older. The median age was 37 years. For every 100 females, there were 92.8 males. For every 100 females age 18 and over, there were 90.0 males.

The median income for a household in the borough was $32,083, and the median income for a family was $40,398. Males had a median income of $31,269 versus $24,188 for females. The per capita income for the borough was $18,781. About 5.1% of families and 10.4% of the population were below the poverty line, including 9.2% of those under age 18 and 12.3% of those age 65 or over.

References

External links

 Borough of Highspire official website

Pennsylvania populated places on the Susquehanna River
Populated places established in 1814
Harrisburg–Carlisle metropolitan statistical area
Boroughs in Dauphin County, Pennsylvania
1867 establishments in Pennsylvania